Aybashevo (Aybaş) is a rural locality (a village) in Berezovsky Selsoviet, Birsky District, Bashkortostan, Russia. The population was 30 as of 2010. There is 1 street.

Geography 
Aybashevo is located 33 km southwest of Birsk (the district's administrative centre) by road. Berezovka is the nearest rural locality.

References 

Rural localities in Birsky District